Ayo Joy is a 2009 documentary film produced by the French company MK2 and directed by Raphaël Duroy about the singer Ayọ. The 90 minute film, which comes into the cinemas end of 2009 or early 2010, shows her life and the search for her roots during the preparations and execution of her first concert in Nigeria, the birth country of her father.

References

External links
 MK2 Catalogue: Ayo Joy
 The mk2 Cine Wire, Festival de Cannes

2009 films
2009 documentary films
Documentary films about women in music
Documentary films about singers
French documentary films
French independent films
Documentary films about African music
Films produced by Marin Karmitz
2009 independent films
2000s French films
2000s French-language films